Yesayan may refer to:

Bagrat Yesayan
Nune Yesayan, (1969-), Armenian pop singer 
Oleg Yesayan, Armenian politician and diplomat 
Tigran Yesayan (1972-), Armenian football player
Zabel Yesayan (1878-1943), Armenian novelist, poet, writer, and teacher

Armenian-language surnames